DXRP (675 AM) Radyo Pilipinas is a radio station owned and operated by the Philippine Broadcasting Service. Its studios are located at the Mindanao Media Hub Building, Carlos P. Garcia Highway, Bangkal, Davao City, and its transmitter is located at Broadcast Ave., Shrine Hills, Matina, Davao City.

From February to August 2018, following the preparation of the Mindanao Broadcast Hub, DXRP was temporarily broadcasting on FM at 87.5 MHz (this frequency broadcasts as Davao City Disaster Radio) while currently looking for a new transmitter location for its main frequency on its AM counterpart.

On December 5, 2020, the studios of Radyo Pilipinas Davao along with its sister station Republika FM1 Davao transferred to the new home at the new Mindanao Media Hub in Bangkal, Davao City.

References

Radio stations in Davao City
News and talk radio stations in the Philippines
Philippine Broadcasting Service
People's Television Network
Radio stations established in 1965
Radyo Pilipinas